Tenebrae (Latin for "darkness") may refer to:

 Tenebrae, Christian worship services held during Holy Week (before Easter)
 Tenebrae Responsoria, prescribed readings for the services
 Tenebrae Responsories (Victoria), settings by Victoria (1585)
 Tenebrae Responsoria (Gesualdo), settings by Gesualdo (1611)
 Leçons de ténèbres (Couperin), settings by Couperin (1714)
 Sept répons des ténèbres, settings by Poulenc (1961)
 Tenebrae (film), a horror film by Dario Argento
 Tenebrae (soundtrack), soundtrack album for the Dario Argento film
 Tenebrae (choir), a professional vocal ensemble founded and directed by Nigel Short
 Lux in Tenebris, farce by Brecht (1919) 
 Tenebrae, a fictional character in the video game Tales of Symphonia: Dawn of the New World
 "Tenebrae", a poem by twentieth-century German poet Paul Celan
 The Tenebrae, a monster organization in the television series Jekyll & Hyde
 The Tenebrae, Latin name for the Keres, female death-spirits
 Tenebrae, a fictional kingdom in the video game Final Fantasy XV
 Tenebrae, a fictional town in the video game Ultima VIII: Pagan 
 The Tenebrea Trilogy, a set of three of science-fiction novels written by Roxann Dawson and Daniel Graham.
 Tenebrae, the birth name of Darth Vitiate, the Sith Emperor in Star Wars: The Old Republic.

See also
 Terebridae, a group of sea mollusks
 :Category:Tenebrae